Pemuda (Indonesian for "youth") may refer to:
Pancasila Youth (Pemuda Pancasila)
People's Youth (Indonesia) (Pemuda Rakyat)
Youth Pledge (Sumpah Pemuda)